Ochrosperma is a group of shrubs and small trees in the myrtle family Myrtaceae described as a genus in 1987. The genus is endemic to Australia.

Species
 Ochrosperma adpressum A.R.Bean - Queensland
 Ochrosperma citriodorum (Penfold & J.L.Willis) Trudgen - New South Wales
 Ochrosperma lineare (C.T.White) Trudgen - Queensland, New South Wales
 Ochrosperma obovatum A.R.Bean - Queensland
 Ochrosperma oligomerum (Radlk.) A.R.Bean - New South Wales
 Ochrosperma sulcatum A.R.Bean - Northern Territory

References

Myrtaceae
Myrtaceae genera
Endemic flora of Australia
Taxa named by Malcolm Eric Trudgen